Kafe may refer to:

 KAFE, a US radio station
 Kafe, a town in Ituri Province, Democratic Republic of the Congo
 Kafe District, Abuja, Nigeria

People with the name 
 Said Kafe (1937–2002), Comorian politician